Bolia may refer to:

 an ethnic subgroup of the Mongo people
 a Bantu language, see Guthrie classification of Bantu languages
 Bolia (town) in Inongo Territory of Mai-Ndombe Province of the Democratic Republic of the Congo
 the Bolia River in the Democratic Republic of the Congo, tributary of the Bolombo River 
 Bolia Sector, a fourth-level subdivision in Inongo Territory, Mai-Ndombe Province, Democratic Republic of the Congo
 the Battle of Bolia a battle in 469 CE in eastern Europe
 the Bolia River in eastern Europe now known as the Ipeľ